Andy R. Thomson (born 1971) is a Canadian architect (M.Arch), environmentalist, tiny-home expert and an advocate for the small house movement.  He is known for his design of miniHome which is a "completely self-sufficient, mobile dwelling, featuring solar and wind energy and recycled and/or nontoxic materials."  MiniHome was developed from his master thesis An Experiment in Minimal Living in Downtown Toronto.  He founded Sustain Design Studio, Ltd in 2005 to market the miniHomes.  He has also worked for the R-2000 program.

Thomson completed his undergraduate degree in Architecture at the University of Stuttgart on a scholarship.  He completed his Masters in Architecture at University of British Columbia.

See also 
 Sustainable architecture

References

External links 
 earthstream.ca

Canadian architects
Canadian environmentalists